Patrice Zéré (born 20 December 1970 in Issia) is an Ivorian former professional footballer who played as a defender.

He played for RC Lens in France, and went on loan to SC Abbeville for the 1989–90 season. He also played several seasons in Belgium for K.S.C. Lokeren.

In 2008, he signed a contract with Africa Sports.

References

External links

1970 births
Living people
People from Sassandra-Marahoué District
Association football defenders
Ivorian footballers
Ivory Coast international footballers
1998 African Cup of Nations players
2000 African Cup of Nations players
Ivorian expatriate footballers
Expatriate footballers in Belgium
Expatriate footballers in France
Belgian Pro League players
Ligue 1 players
RC Lens players
Ligue 2 players
US Créteil-Lusitanos players
R.A.E.C. Mons players
K.S.C. Lokeren Oost-Vlaanderen players
SC Abbeville players
K.R.C. Zuid-West-Vlaanderen players